Hugh Martin Morris (April 9, 1878 – March 19, 1966) was a United States district judge of the United States District Court for the District of Delaware.

Education and career

Born on April 9, 1878, in Greenwood, Delaware, Morris received a Bachelor of Arts degree in 1898 from Delaware College (now the University of Delaware) and read law in 1903. He entered private practice in Wilmington, Delaware from 1903 to 1919.

Federal judicial service

Morris was nominated by President Woodrow Wilson on January 17, 1919, to a seat on the United States District Court for the District of Delaware vacated by Judge Edward Green Bradford II. He was confirmed by the United States Senate on January 27, 1919, and received his commission the same day. His service terminated on June 30, 1930, due to his resignation.

Later career and death

Following his resignation from the federal bench, Morris returned to private practice in Wilmington from 1930 to 1966. He died on March 19, 1966.

Estate

Judge Morris' estate was purchased by the State of Delaware in 1998 and is part of the White Clay Creek State Park.

References

External links
 
 

1878 births
1966 deaths
University of Delaware alumni
Delaware lawyers
People from Wilmington, Delaware
Judges of the United States District Court for the District of Delaware
United States district court judges appointed by Woodrow Wilson
20th-century American judges
People from Greenwood, Delaware